Herbal teas, also known as herbal infusions and less commonly called tisanes (UK and US , US also ), are beverages made from the infusion or decoction of herbs, spices, or other plant material in hot water. Oftentimes herb tea, or the plain term tea, is used as a reference to all sorts of herbal teas. Many herbs are used in herbal medicine. Some herbal blends contain actual tea (e.g., the Indian classic masala chai).

The term "herbal" tea is often used in contrast to the so-called true teas (e.g., black, green, white, yellow, oolong), which are prepared from the cured leaves of the tea plant, Camellia sinensis. Unlike true teas (which are also available decaffeinated), most tisanes do not naturally contain caffeine. There are a number of plants, however, that do contain caffeine or another stimulant, like theobromine, cocaine or ephedrine. Some have the opposite effect, acting as a sedative.

Etymology 

Some feel that the term tisane is more correct than herbal tea or that the latter is even misleading, but most dictionaries record that the word tea is also used to refer to other plants beside the tea plant and to beverages made from these other plants. In any case, the term herbal tea is very well established and much more common than tisane.

The word tisane was rare in its modern sense before the 20th century, when it was borrowed in the modern sense from French. (This is why some people feel it should be pronounced  as in French, but the original English pronunciation  continues to be more common in US English and especially in UK English.)

The word had already existed in late Middle English in the sense of "medicinal drink" and had already been borrowed from French (Old French). The Old French word came from the Latin word , which came from the Ancient Greek word , which meant "peeled" barley, in other words pearl barley, and a drink made from this that is similar to modern barley water.

Composition 

Herbal teas can be made with fresh or dried flowers, fruit, leaves, seeds or roots. They are made by pouring boiling water over the plant parts and letting them steep for a few minutes. The herbal tea is then strained, sweetened if desired, and served. Many companies produce herbal tea bags for such infusions.

Varieties 

While varieties of tisanes can be made from any edible plant material, below is a list of those commonly used for such:
 Anise tea, made from either the seeds or the leaves
 Asiatic penny-wort leaf, in South Asia and Southeast Asia
 Artichoke tea
 Bael fruit tea
 Bee balm
 Boldo, used in South America
 Burdock; the seeds, leaves, and roots have been used
 Cannabis tea, used in the preparation of bhang
 Caraway, tea made from the seeds
 Catnip, tea used as a relaxant, sedative, and to calm
 Chamomile
 Che dang, bitter tea made from Ilex  leaves
 Chinese knotweed tea
 Chrysanthemum tea, made from dried flowers
 Cinnamon
 Clover tea, made from the blossoms 
 Coca tea, infusion made from coca leaves. Contains trace amounts of cocaine and similar alkaloids. In some countries where coca is illegal, products marketed as "coca tea" are supposed to be decocainized, i.e., the pharmacologically active components have been removed from the leaf using the same chemicals as manufacturing cocaine.
 Cacao bean tea
Hot cocoa is not an herbal tea because the plant material is dissolved in water (or milk), but cacao bean can be used to make a tea.
 Coffee-leaf tea, coffee fruit tea, and coffee blossom tea are herbal teas made using the leaves, fruits and flowers of the coffee plant
 Coffee bean tea, or simply coffee, a tisane made from the seeds of the coffee plant
 Cerasse, bitter Jamaican herb
 Citrus peel, including bergamot, lemon and orange peel
 Dandelion coffee
 Dill tea
 Dried lime tea, made from dried limes common in western Asia
 Echinacea tea
 Elderberry
 European mistletoe (Viscum album), (steep in cold water for 2–6 hours)
 Essiac tea, blended herbal tea
 Fennel
 Gentian
 Ginger root can be made into herbal tea, known in the Philippines as salabat
 Ginseng, a common tea in China and Korea, commonly used as a stimulant and as a caffeine substitute
 Goji
 Guayusa, caffeinated tree of the holly genus, native to the Amazon rainforest.
 Hawthorn
 Hibiscus (often blended with rose hip), a common tea in the Middle East or Asia
 Honeybush, similar to rooibos and grows in a nearby area of South Africa, but tastes slightly sweeter. Has a low tannin content, no caffeine.
 Horehound
 Houttuynia
 Hydrangea tea, dried leaves of hydrangeas; considerable care must be taken because most species contain a toxin.  The "safe" hydrangeas belong to the Hydrangea serrata Amacha ("sweet tea") cultivar group.
 Jiaogulan (also known as xiancao or "poor man's ginseng")
 Kapor tea, dried leaves of fireweed
 Kava root, from the South Pacific, can be made into a tea for stomach upsets and other minor illnesses. The traditional form is a water-based suspension of kava roots.
 Kratom, dried leaves of the kratom tree.
 Kuzuyu, a thick white Japanese tea made by adding kudzu flour to hot water
 Labrador tea, made from the shrub by the same name, found in the northern part of North America
 Lemon balm
 Lemon and ginger tea
 Lemongrass
 Luo han guo
 Licorice root
 Lime blossom, dried flowers of the lime tree (tilia in Latin).
 Mate South American caffeinated tea made from yerba mate
 Mint (mint tea), especially peppermint (also mixed with green tea)
Maghrebi mint tea
Meadowsweet herb
Korean mint tea
 Mound of termites tea in Merauke
 Moringa
 Mountain tea, common in the Balkans and other areas of the Mediterranean region. Made from a variety of the Sideritis syriaca plant which grows in warm climates above 3,000 feet. Records of its use date back 2,000 years.
 Neem leaf
 Nettle leaf
 New Jersey tea
 Noni tea
 Oksusu cha, traditional roasted corn tea found in Korea
 Olive leaf tea
 Osmanthus tea, dried flowers of the sweet olive tree, are used alone or blended with tea leaves in China.
 Pandan tea
 Patchouli tea
 Pennyroyal leaf, an abortifacient
 Pine tea, or tallstrunt, made from needles of pine trees
 Poppy tea, consumed for its sedative and analgesic properties
 Qishr, Yemeni drink with coffee husks and ginger
 Red clover tea
 Red raspberry leaf
 Barley tea, East Asian drink with roasted barley
 Roasted wheat, used in Postum, a coffee substitute
 Rooibos (red bush), a reddish plant used to make an infusion and grown in South Africa. In the US it is sometimes called red tea. It has many of the antioxidant characteristics of green tea, but because it does not come from tea leaves, it has no caffeine.
 Rose hip (often blended with hibiscus)
 Roselle petals (species of hibiscus; known by other names including bissau and dah), consumed in the Sahel and elsewhere
 Rosemary
 Sagebrush, California sagebrush
 Sage
 Sakurayu, Japanese herbal tea made with pickled cherry blossom petals
 Salvia
 Sassafras roots were steeped to make tea and were used in the flavoring of root beer until being banned by the FDA.
 Scorched rice, known as hyeonmi cha in Korea
 Skullcap
 Shallot peel tea from Kalimantan
 Serendib (tea), tea from Sri Lanka
 Sobacha
 Spearmint
 Spicebush (Lindera benzoin) leaves used to make a tea by some native peoples of eastern North America
 Spruce tea, made from needles of spruce trees
 Staghorn sumac, fruit can be made into a lemonade
 Stevia, can be used to make herbal tea, or as a sweetener in other beverages
 St. John's wort
 Thyme, contains thymol
 Tulsi, or holy basil
 Turmeric tea
 Uncaria tomentosa, commonly known as cat's claw
 Valerian is used as a sedative.
 Verbena (vervain)
 Wax gourd in East Asia and Southeast Asia.
 Wong Lo Kat, a recipe for herbal tea from Guangdong, China since the Qing Dynasty
 Woodruff
 Yarrow

Health risks 

While most herbal teas are safe for regular consumption, some herbs have toxic or allergenic effects. Among the greatest causes of concern are:
 Comfrey, which contains alkaloids which may be harmful to the liver from chronic use, and particularly is not recommended during pregnancy or when prescription drugs are used; comfrey is not recommended for oral use.
 Lobelia, which contains alkaloids and has traditional medicine uses for smoking cessation, may cause nausea, vomiting, or dizziness at high doses.

Herbal teas can also have different effects from person to person, and this is further compounded by the problem of potential misidentification. The deadly foxglove, for example, can be mistaken for the much more benign (but still relatively toxic to the liver) comfrey. Care must be taken not to use any poisonous plants.

The US does not require herbal teas to have any evidence concerning their efficacy, but does treat them technically as food products and require that they be safe for consumption.

Fruit or fruit-flavored tea is usually acidic and thus may contribute to erosion of tooth enamel.

Contamination 

Depending on the source of the herbal ingredients, herbal teas, like any crop, may be contaminated with pesticides or heavy metals.
According to Naithani & Kakkar (2004), "all herbal preparations should be checked for toxic chemical residues to allay consumer fears of exposure to known neuro-toxicant pesticides and to aid in promoting global acceptance of these products".

During pregnancy 
In addition to the issues mentioned above which are toxic to all people, several medicinal herbs are considered abortifacients, and if consumed by a pregnant individual could cause miscarriage. These include common ingredients like nutmeg, mace, papaya, bitter melon, verbena, saffron, slippery elm, and possibly pomegranate. It also includes more obscure herbs, like mugwort, rue, pennyroyal, wild carrot, blue cohosh, tansy, and savin.

See also 

 List of hot beverages
 Tea culture
 Health effects of tea
 Tincture, the often more concentrated plant extracts made in pure grain alcohol, glycerin, or vinegar
 Yerba mate
 Hot chocolate
 Coffee substitute

References

External links

 Variety of Teas review from https://www.mydraw.com/